Philochortus phillipsi, known commonly as Phillips' orangetail lizard or Phillips' shield-backed lizard, is a species of lizard in the family Lacertidae. The species is endemic to the Horn of Africa.

Etymology
The specific name, phillipsi, is in honor of British naturalist Ethelbert Lort Phillips.

Geographic range
P. phillipsi is found in Ethiopia and Somalia.

Description
P. phillipsi is a small lizard with a very long tail.

Reproduction
P. phillipsi is oviparous.

References

Further reading
Boulenger GA (1898). "On a Second Collection of Reptiles made by Mr. E. Lort-Phillips in Somaliland". Annals and Magazine of Natural History, Seventh Series 2: 130–133. (Latastia phillipsii, new species, pp. 131–132).
Boulenger (1917). "On the Lizards of the Genus Philochortus Matschie". Proceedings of the Zoological Society of London 1917: 145-157 + Plates I-II. (Philochortus phillipsii, new combination, pp. 148-150 + Plate I, figures 3, 3a, 3b, 3c, 4).
Lanza B (1990). "Amphibians and reptiles of the Somali Democratic Republic: check list and biogeography". Biogeographia 14: 407–465.
Largen, Malcolm; Spawls, Stephen (2010). The Amphibians and Reptiles of Ethiopia and Eritrea. Frankfurt am Main: Edition Chimaira / Serpents Tale. 694 pp. . (Philochortus phillipsi, p. 360).
Parker HW (1942). "The Lizards of British Somaliland (With an appendix on Topography and Climate by Capt. R. H. R. Taylor, O. B. E.)". Bulletin of the Museum of Comparative Zoölogy at Harvard College 91 (1): 1–101. (Philochortus phillipsi, p. 76).

Philochortus
Lacertid lizards of Africa
Reptiles of Ethiopia
Reptiles of Somalia
Reptiles described in 1898
Taxa named by George Albert Boulenger